Bad Boy is a song written by Lil Armstrong and Avon Long. It became a hit for The Jive Bombers in 1957.  The song has since been covered by The Escorts, Mink DeVille, Ringo Starr, Sha Na Na, Maryann Price, David Johansen performing as Buster Poindexter, and others, and was used in the first-season finale of the television show "Crime Story" as well as in the 1990 film Cry-Baby.
The Mink DeVille version was included in the 1983 film Breathless.

History

Lil Hardin Armstrong originally wrote it as Brown Gal and recorded it for Decca Records in 1936, and it had been covered by several artists since, including the Ink Spots in 1938 as Brown Gal, and Benny Calloway with the Four Steps of Jive.  Clarence Palmer, the lead singer of the Jive Bombers, had recorded the song earlier in December 1949 as Brown Boy on Decca's Coral Records subsidiary, billed as Al Sears and the Sparrows and released in February 1950.

See Also

 Bad Boy (1978 Ringo Starr album)

References

1957 singles